April 1933 Siamese coup d'état was a government change on 1 April 1933 by conservative and monarchist elites, led by Phraya Manopakorn Nititada (Phraya Mano), after the Draft National Economic Plan proposed by Pridi Banomyong, Khana Ratsadon's progressive leader, was deemed a communist threat by King Prajadhipok and Mano. It is considered to be the first coup in Thailand's history, followed by the first military coup two months later by Khana Ratsadon's army officer, Phraya Phahonphonphayuhasena.

Background 

On 24 June 1932, Khana Ratsadon ("The People's Party") carried out a bloodless revolution against the absolute rule of King Prajadhipok (Rama VII) and drafted a new provisional constitution. The constitution stripped the king of most of his powers, and granted them to the new Government of Siam, which included the People's Assembly (the legislative branch), the People's Committee (the executive branch), and the Supreme Court (the judicial branch). The president of this new assembly would be the head of government and the de facto Prime Minister of Siam. The role was offered and accepted by the 48 year-old former Minister of Justice, Privy Councillor and Middle Temple lawyer, Phraya Manopakorn Nititada. Phraya Mano was selected more probably out of pragmatism and shrewdness rather than any honourable intention.

Prelude

Conflict between political tendencies 
The plan drew criticism upon publication, including from newspapers, intellectuals stoked mostly by the urban elites, and landed nobility under the newly formed Khana Chart ("National Party"), seeking a way to discredit the People's Party. The criticism centred on the socialistic nature of the dossier, including charges of communism and charges that Pridi was instigating a social revolution. The criticisms were also aimed at Phraya Mano, who allowed Pridi to publish the plan. Despite these charges, the People's Party, the young revolutionaries, and most of the urban middle class and rural poor stood behind Pridi. The debate, however, escalated into a constitutional crisis when King Prajadhipok, who had confessed to the nation that he had little knowledge of financial affairs, attacked Pridi verbally and asked whether Pridi copied his plans from the Soviet Union.

The People's Committee was split between two opposing political tendencies; that of the old Thai, conservative and monarchist, led by Phraya Mano, and that of the new school, democratic and perhaps republican, led by Pridi. Phraya Mano realised the danger of Pridi's plans. On one side were the revolutionaries and members of the People's Party. On the other were civil servants and some elite members of the military, and former revolutionaries, among them Phraya Songsuradet, Phraya Ritthi Akhaney, and Phra Prasan Pithayayut. These men threatened Pridi and his supporters, stating that they would carry weapons into the assembly. When Pridi did not attend a session, they surrounded Pridi's house with armed supporters.

Silent coup 
Phraya Mano called for the dissolution of the People's Assembly on 1 April 1933. Under the emergency decree, some parts of the constitution, including the legislature and the judiciary, were suspended. While closing the People's Assembly, Phraya Mano stated that:

On April 2, the government issued the "Anti-Communist Act", which gave the police executive powers to arrest citizens who are considered to be communist without trial. Under this law, the People's Party was disbanded. The New York Times reported this as an act against a communist movement.

References

Bibliography

 
 

Siamese revolution of 1932
1930s coups d'état and coup attempts
1930s in Thailand
1933 in Siam
Conflicts in 1933
1933
Political history of Thailand
Battles and conflicts without fatalities
April 1933 events